Seattle Center is an arts, educational, tourism and entertainment center in Seattle, Washington, United States. Spanning an area of 74 acres (30 ha), it was originally built for the 1962 World's Fair. Seattle Center is located just north of Belltown in the Uptown neighborhood.

Attractions

Landmarks 

Space Needle, an official city landmark, featuring an observation deck and revolving restaurant
International Fountain, located in the middle of the campus, operates all year round. Built for the 1962 World's Fair, the fountain was built as a modernist water sculpture and renovated extensively in 1995. With over 20 spouts, the fountain goes through programmed cycles of shooting water patterns, accompanied by recorded world music. The music is changed twice a month; it is chosen to coordinate with the water patterns and events programming at the center.
Seattle Center Monorail terminus
John T. Williams totem pole - A 34 feet (10 m) high totem pole commemorating John T. Williams
Kobe Bell, an official city landmark
The outdoor Mural Amphitheatre, featuring a mosaic mural by Paul Horiuchi: the Horiuchi Mural, also created for the World's Fair, is an official city landmark.
Artists At Play playground
Howard S. Wright Memorial Fountain

Museums 

Museum of Pop Culture (MoPOP, formerly EMP Museum)
Chihuly Garden and Glass
Pacific Science Center, home of an IMAX Theater and Seattle Laser Dome
Seattle Children's Museum in the Armory

Performing arts

Seattle Repertory Theatre, home of the Bagley Wright Theatre, the Leo Kreielsheimer Theatre, and the PONCHO Forum
Center Theatre, home of the Seattle Shakespeare Company and Book-It Repertory Theatre
Theatre Puget Sound
The Center School
Cornish Playhouse, home of productions of the Cornish College of the Arts
Marion Oliver McCaw Hall, home of Seattle Opera and Pacific Northwest Ballet, whose ballet school is adjacent at the Phelps Center. This is the third performance space on this site, the second being the Opera House built at the time of the World's Fair.
Seattle Children's Theatre at the Charlotte Martin Theatre
The Vera Project (or VERA)
Mercer Arena, formerly a sports, concert, and opera venue before sitting dormant for several years. It was demolished and the site is being redeveloped as the future home of Seattle Opera.

Venues 

Seattle Center Armory (known as Center House from the early 1970s until 2012, and the Food Circus from 1962 to the early 1970s), including Center Theatre, the home of Seattle Shakespeare Company and Book-It Repertory Theatre, as well as the Seattle Children's Museum, The Center High School and the Academy of Interactive Entertainment. Before the 1962 World's Fair, the building was an armory. Seattle Center Armory is an official city landmark.
A piece of the Berlin Wall is in the food atrium.
Exhibition Hall, a space for trade shows, receptions, exhibits, and special events
Fisher Pavilion at Seattle Center is one of the largest rental venues on the grounds and the first City of Seattle building to achieve LEED (Leadership in Energy and Environmental Design) certification. The large, flexible space can accommodate a wide range of commercial, charity and community events.
The Northwest Rooms, once a small conference center, now houses SIFF Film Center, The VERA Project, and KEXP-FM.

Athletics
Climate Pledge Arena is the current home of the Seattle University Redhawks men's basketball team, the WNBA's Seattle Storm and the NHL's Seattle Kraken. It was the home of the NBA's Seattle SuperSonics, now the Oklahoma City Thunder, and the Seattle Thunderbirds (Western Hockey League) ice hockey. Originally opened as the Seattle Center Coliseum in 1962, it was renovated in 1995 as KeyArena and rebuilt in 2020-2021 as Climate Pledge Arena. The arena hosts over 100 events per year and was the region's top live concert touring venue in 2016 (according to Venues Today magazine)
Memorial Stadium, a high school football and soccer stadium which predates the World's Fair. It was the home of the NWSL's OL Reign from 2014 to 2018.

Festivals
Seattle Center hosts many cultural, music and arts festivals. Major attractions include:
Bumbershoot
Seattle Center Festál, a year-long series of 24 world cultural events, the largest of which is Northwest Folklife
PrideFest
Bite of Seattle
Winterfest

Gallery

References

External links

Seattle Center Foundation

Guide to the Seattle Center Annual Reports 1966–ongoing
Seattle Center Century 21 Committee
Seattle PrideFest
"Seattle Center", pp. 18–24 in Survey Report: Comprehensive Inventory of City-Owned Historic Resources, Seattle, Washington, Department of Neighborhoods (Seattle) Historic Preservation, offers an extremely detailed account of the history of the buildings and grounds.

 
Busking venues
Landmarks in Seattle
Tourist attractions in Seattle
World's fair sites in Washington (state)